Pointers Creek is a stream in Osage County, Missouri.

The source area for the stream lie just south of U.S. Route 50 and southwest of Potts. The stream flows about four miles to the southeast to enter the Gasconade.

Pointers Creek has the name of the local Pointer family.

See also
List of rivers of Missouri

References

Rivers of Osage County, Missouri
Rivers of Missouri
Tributaries of the Gasconade River